Novo-Nikolayevka is a rural locality (a selo) in Akhtubinsky District, Astrakhan Oblast, Russia. The population was 1,118 as of 2010. There are 15 streets.

Geography 
Novo-Nikolayevka is located 35 km south of Akhtubinsk (the district's administrative centre) by road. Bolkhuny is the nearest rural locality.

References 

Rural localities in Akhtubinsky District